Richard George Warden is an English actor.

Warden studied at Dr Challoner's Grammar School and received a B.A. honours in history at Churchill College, Cambridge, 1994. He married actress Lucy Barker on 1 May 2004.

He is probably best known for his appearances in the HBO miniseries Band of Brothers as 1st Lt. Harry Welsh, the BBC docudrama Dunkirk as Major Phillip Newman RAMC, and the HBO/BBC2 historical drama, Rome, as Quintus Valerius Pompey and Indian Summers as Ronnie Keane. He also appeared in Evol (2006) (with his wife) and in the film adaptation of Bravo Two Zero. He performed in the BBC serial production, Apparitions, as the character Michael, who is possessed by a demon. He played Mike Taylor, a police inspector, in the crime drama Happy Valley.

He also appears in the Chemical Brothers music video "Hey Boy Hey Girl".

In 2019, Warden appeared in the BBC medical drama series Casualty as Ciaran Coulson. He reprised his role in 2021.

References

External links
 
 

Alumni of Churchill College, Cambridge
Living people
People educated at Dr Challoner's Grammar School
Year of birth missing (living people)